Valery Yakovlevich Leontiev (born 19 March 1949) is a Soviet and Russian pop singer, sometimes songwriter and actor whose popularity peaked in the early 1980s. He was titled a People's Artist of Russia in 1996. He is known as one of the most prominent artists of Soviet and Russian music. Over the course of his decades-long career, he has recorded more than 30 albums, many of which sold millions of copies. The media refers to Leontiev as a megastar and a legend of the Russian stage.

Early life
Valery Yakovlevich Leontiev was born on 19 March 1949, in Ust-Usa, a village in what is now Russia's Komi Republic. In 1961 the family moved to the city Yuryevets in Ivanovo Oblast.

Musical career
Leontiev's first performance on the big stage took place in 1971, during the Vorkuta regional competition "Song-71". There, Leontiev took second place with the song "Carnaval".

In 1980 Leontiev sang in various concerts, including the Moscow Variety Theatre, Oktyabrsky and Luzhniki. In 1981, the artist won the popularity prize at the prestigious music festival Yerevan-81. American journalists who attended the event noted the expressive manner of performing of the singer and compared him to Mick Jagger. In 1982, Leontiev underwent a serious operation to remove a tumor from his throat, which jeopardized his further singing career.

In 1983, the singer moves to work in the Voroshilovgrad Philharmonic (now Luhansk Philharmonic) in the Ukrainian SSR. A year later, he was given a whole section in the author's evening "Holy love of music" by composer Raimond Pauls in Moscow.

In 1985, Leontiev received the Lenin Komsomol Prize. And after that he went to Afghanistan together with a group of artists. 1986 was marked by a trip to Chernobyl, where the singer performed. And in 1987 Leontiev already became Merited Artist of Ukrainian SSR.

The beginning of the 90s was marked for Leontiev splash touring. His concerts were held in Germany, Israel, USA, Canada, India and other countries. In 1991 Leontiev was named the "Best Selling Soviet Artist" at the World Music Awards ceremony in Monte Carlo. In 1994 he performed on stage with Gina Lollobrigida in Saint-Petersburg concert hall "Oktyabrskiy", and in 1996 he was awarded the title People's Artist of Russia. in March 1998 а nominal star of Valery Leontiev was opened on the Star Square in Moscow. in 1999 Leontiev was  awarded the "Living Legend Award" at the Russian national music award "Ovation".

On the stage

1972 – First solo concert was in Vorkuta.
1975 – Tour in USSR
1978 – Tour in Belarus
1980 – First concerts in Moscow 
1981 – First solo concerts in Oktyabrskiy Big Concert Hall, Leningrad
1981 – First participation in the finale of the festival "Song of the Year "
1981 – participated in the competition – festival "Yerevan-81".
1982 – Tour in USSR
1983 – concert program, "I'm just a singer" (18 sold-out concerts in Leningrad)
1984 – concert program, "I run for life"
1985 – concert program, "Alone with all", which became a cult. Because queues for tickets on a few central streets of Leningrad stopped traffic. 10 concerts
1986 – concert program "Star story" Tour in Czechoslovakia.
1987 – concert program "Favorites", Tour in Bulgaria.
1988 June – 1989 November – rock opera "Giordano", more than 50 concerts in Moscow and Leningrad. Leontiev plays 3 main roles (out of 4!) – Giordano Bruno, a clown and Satan.
1988 – show "A matter of taste", tour in India
1988–1989 grand tour of cities of the USSR. For example, only one Novosibirsk in 1988 Leontiev gives a series of 27 recitals. and in Almaty 33 solo concerts.
1990 – show "It seems to me that I have not lived" in the Olympic Stadium. Concerts in USA, India, Germany, Israel
1991 – Tour in India, Canada, USA, Germany
1992 – Tour in Israel, Canada, USA
1993 – show "Full Moon" – first super-show in Russia
1994 – show "Beauty and Casanova" – the first concert of pop star with a symphony orchestra in Russia. With the participation of the sex symbol of the 1960 Gina Lollobrigida. Tour in Israel.
1996 – show "On the road to Hollywood", touring in the US, Germany, Israel, Canada
1998 – Concert on the Star Square, a solo concert at the 50 th anniversary of the State of Israel (Tel Aviv, 14 May 1998), a tour in Germany, the United States and the United Arab Emirates
1999 super-show "Photographer of Dreams", a tour to Russia, Ukraine, Israel, United States, Canada, Germany, Baltic states
2001 super-show "Unnamed Planet", a tour to Russia, Ukraine, Baltic States, United States, Germany. 
2002 –  concert in Atlantic City, Moscow, Kyiv, Tallinn, Riga, Vilnius, Minsk. Tour in Baltic states, Israel, Germany
2003 – concert tour of "The Sixth Life" (Russia, Ukraine, United States, Germany, Israel)
2004, concert in Los Angeles, 11–14 March – solo concerts in Oktyabrskiy Big Concert Hall.
2004, 12 March – The 300th solo concert in St. Petersburg. 
2005 – concert program, "Valery Leontiev presents ..." (Russia, Ukraine, Belarus..) 
2006–2008 – Tour to Russia, Ukraine, Belarus, Latvia, Kazakhstan, Uzbekistan, Kyrgyzstan, Azerbaijan, Israel
2009–2010 an anniversary show of "I love you, miss you, I'm waiting". Tour in Russia, Ukraine, Belarus, Latvia, Kazakhstan, Uzbekistan, Kyrgyzstan, Azerbaijan, USA., Israel, Australia, concert in Sydney, Melbourne.
2011 - 21–22 October – concert in the Kremlin Palace of Congresses (the show "The best ever!")
2012 – Tour with a concert program "The best ever!", dedicated to the 40th anniversary of creative activity (Russia, Ukraine, Сanada, USA);
2012 - 21–22 October – concert in the Kremlin Palace of Congresses (show "By popular demand ...")
2013 – Tour in Russia, Ukraine, Kazakhstan
2014 – 19, 21, 22 March – The anniversary concerts in the Oktyabrskiy Big Concert Hall, St. Petersburg; 28 March – the anniversary concert in the State Kremlin Palace, concert in Geneva, Israel
2015 – Creative Evening of Valery Leontiev in Sochi. Tour in Russia, Belarus, Kazakhstan, Germany.

Music awards

World Music Awards
 1991 - "Best-selling soviet recording-artist of the year"

ZD Awards
 1980 - Singer of the year
 1984 - Singer of the year
 1985 - Singer of the year
 1986 - Singer of the year
 1996 - Best show of the year – "On the road to Hollywood"
 1999 - Best show of the year – "Photographer of Dreams"
 2001 - Best show of the year – "Nameless Planet"
 2009 - Special prize "Legend"
 2014 - Special prize for a contribution to the development of Russian pop music

Ovation
 1998 - "Living Legend"

Golden Gramophone Award
 1997 - For song "One ticket" (Один билет)
 1999 - For song "Everybody wants to love" (Каждый хочет любить)
 2000 - For song "Augustine" (Августин)
 2005 - Special prize "For contribution to the development of the Russian pop music"
 2008 - For song "Dove" (Голуби)

Pesnya goda
 1997 – Singer of the year and prize for a great contribution to the development of Russian pop music.

Muz-TV Awards
 2003 -  Special prize "For achievements in the development of popular music"

Russian Music Awards
 2015 - Special prize for "a unique contribution to the development of the Russian pop music".
 2019 - Special prize for "contribution to the development of national culture."

Song Contest Awards
 1980 –First prize of the XVI International Festival "Golden Orpheus" in Bulgaria

Others
 1981 – Performer of the Year according to the contest, "Estrada-81" (Komsomolskaya Pravda)
 1983 – Singer of the Year according to a poll of readers of the newspaper "Smena" 
 1987 – The best song of the year "White Crow"  on the basis of open voting ITAR-TASS in the USSR, Poland, Czech Republic, Hungary and others.
 1988 – Singer of the Year on the basis of open voting ITAR-TASS
 1990 – Best song of the Year according to the All-Union charts TASS "Wicked Way" (Грешный путь)
 1992 – Singer of the Year according to chart hit of the newspaper "Vechernyaya Moskva" 
 1992 – Song of the Year "At the gates of the Lord" (У ворот Господних) according to chart hit of the newspaper "Vechernyaya Moskva" 
 1998 – "Stopudoviy Hit" award from the radio station Hit FM for the song "Nine chrysanthemums" (Девять хризантем)
28 March 1998 – the inception of a star on the Star Square (Moscow).
 1999 –"Stopudoviy Hit" award from the radio station Hit FM for the song "Everyone wants to love" (Каждый хочет любить)
 2000 –"Stopudoviy Hit" award from the radio station Hit FM for the song "Augustine" (Августин)
 2005 –Valery Leontiev listed in the Russian Encyclopedia.
 "God of the Ether 2009" in nomination "Radiorekord" (for the record number of rotations)

Honours and awards

Orders
 Order of Merit for the Fatherland, 3th class (21 February 2022) – for a great contribution to the development of national culture and art, many years of fruitful activity
 Order of Merit for the Fatherland, 4th class (19 March 2005) – for his great contribution to the development of music
 Order of Honor (2009)  – for great contribution to the development of national music art and many years of creative activity 
  Order of Friendship (2014)

Titles
People's Artist of Russia (9 March 1996)
Merited Artist of Ukrainian SSR (1987)
People's Artist of the Republic of Komi (2009)
Honorary Citizen of Sakha Republic (2014)

Medals
Medal "For Faith and Good" (2010)

Awards
Lenin Komsomol Prize (1985) – for the promotion of Soviet pop songs of youth and high performance skills
Prize of the Moscow Government in the field of literature and the arts (1996) – for the super show "Full Moon" and "On the way to Hollywood"
Prize of the Ministry of Internal Affairs of Russia in the field of literature and the arts (1999)  
Belarus president award Through Art - to Peace and Understanding presented by Alexander Lukashenko on 12 July 2009

Public awards
Order of Mikhail Lomonosov (2007)
Order "For the rebirth of Russia. 21st Century" (2003)

|-
! colspan="3" style="background: pink;" | Golden Orpheus
|-

|-
! colspan="3" style="background: cyan;" | World Music Awards
|-

|-
! colspan="3" style="background: red;" | Ovation
|-

|-
! colspan="3" style="background: silver;" | Muz-TV Music Awards
|-

! colspan="3" style="background: #DAA520;" | Slavianski Bazaar
|-

|-

Discography
See Valery Leontiev discography

Studio albums

Songwriting credits

As composer 
All songs composed with Yuri Varum.

 1985: Mongolia (Монголия)
 1985: Flower Seller (Продавец цветов) (Remake released in 2014)
 1986: Remember them Flying (Запомни их летящими)
 1986: Game № 1 (Игра No. 1)
 1986: Fires (Костры)
 1987: Dog Show (Выставка собак)
 1987: Familiar Fairy Tale (Знакомая сказка)
 1987: Kukaracha (Кукарача)
 1987: Skyscrapers (Небоскрёбы)
 1987: I Don't Like (Я не люблю)
 1988: I Went to the Microphone (Я вышел к микрофону)

As lyricist 

 1985: Birth Day (Рождение дня) (Lyrics co-written with Vladimir Kostrov)
 1993: Touch (Прикоснись) (Lyrics co-written with Nikolai Denisov)

Filmography 

1981: In a strange feast (На чужом празднике)
1985: Do Not Marry, Girls (Не ходите, девки, замуж)
1985: Insurance agent (Страховой агент)
1992: Psychic (Экстрасенс)

Musical films and musicals

1979: Crimean Dawns (Крымские зори)
1979: The film-concert "Olümpiaregati tähed \ Stars Olympic regatta"  CT USSR and ETV 
1984: I do not say goodbye to you ( Я с тобой не прощаюсь)
1984: Winds Baltic ETV 
1985: Stained glass maker (Витражных дел мастер)
1986: Clown with autumn in the heart (Клоун с осенью в сердце)
1986: How to become a star (Как стать звездой)
1987: Valery Leontiev (film) 
1990: Valery Leontiev. Let me go with you (Валерий Леонтьев. Дай мне уйти с тобой)
1991: Valery Leontiev Sings ( Поёт Валерий Леонтьев)
1991: Valery Leontiev. Made in India (Валерий Леонтьев. Made in India) 
1997: Saturday evening with Valery Leontiev (Musical film RTR)
1997: Such different Valery Leontiev (Такой разный Валерий Леонтьев)
1997: Parade parade is Valery Leontiev (Парад парадов представляет Валерий Леонтьев) movie channel TV-6)
2000: The reverse side of Valery Leontiev (Обратная сторона Валерия Леонтьева) movie channel ORT
2002: Cinderella (Musical film)
2003: Three tunes for the film Valery Leontiev (Три мелодии для фильма Валерия Леонтьева)
2009: Valery Leontiev in Komi (Валерий Леонтьев в Коми) 
2009: I have not lived. Valery Leontiev (— Я ещё не жил. Валерий Леонтьев) movie channel ORT
2009: Valery Leontiev: Lost laughter (Валерий Леонтьев: Утерянный смех) movie channel Inter
2009: Benefit Valery Leontiev "The Book of Fate" (Бенефис Валерия Леонтьева "Книга судьбы") movie channel NTV
2012: Anniversary concert of Valery Leontiev "The best ever!" (Юбилейный концерт Валерия Леонтьева "Лучший навсегда!") concert channelORT
2012: "Hurtling time if a rider" ("Мчится время будто всадник") movie channel TV Tsentr

Personal life
Valery Leontiev is married to bass guitarist Lyudmila Isakovich. The couple have been together since 1972. However, officially their marriage was registered only in 1998. The artist's wife lives in Miami.

Eurovision Song Contest 1987
The Soviet Union never participated in the Eurovision Song Contest, as no Soviet broadcasters were members of the EBU. In 2009 Eduard Fomin, a former employee of the Ministry of Education of the RSFSR, revealed that in 1987 George Veselov, the Minister of Education for the Soviet Union, brought forward the idea of Soviet participation in the EBU and the Eurovision Song Contest due to the number of political reforms made by the Soviet General Secretary Mikhail Gorbachev during the late 1980s. The idea was mainly a political one, with the thought that a win in the contest for the Soviet Union would impact on the relationships between the Soviet Union and the capitalist countries of the west. Valery Leontiev was suggested as a singer for the Soviet Union's first entry into the contest, but Veselov's ideas were not shared by the Communist Party of the Soviet Union, or by Gorbachev himself, believing it to be too radical a step to take, and so the Soviet Union never entered the contest before dissolving.

Statements about Leontiev
President Vladimir Putin: "You rightly recognized master of song genre, artist who reached the summits of Pop Olympus thanks to genuine talent, professionalism and hard work"
President Dmitry Medvedev: "Over the years, the bright stage career, you not only have gained a great love of fans, but also sets a high standard of music for the new generations of artists. The songs performed by you, always lead not only in the charts, but also in the hearts of an audience of millions".
President Alexander Lukashenko: "Great talent, unparalleled professional skills and constant creative search brought you a well-deserved fame and recognition around the world"
Politician Valentina Matviyenko "You have created a stage persona which has never been on the stage and I am sure that nobody will never repeat, and you follow this image"
Singer Muslim Magomayev: "Name Valery Leontiev enough just to name – and do not have any colorful definitions! Everything is clear! Living Classic of our stage".
Singer Joseph Kobzon: "Tragically, we have a unit of this magnitude stars – Pugacheva, Leontiev ... Those people who for many years retain their creative person and love of the public"

Real estate
 3 storey  apartment in Kolokolnikov Lane, Meshchansky District, Moscow. Purchased in 1993.
Villa in Coral Gables, Florida, USA (neighbors – Sylvester Stallone and Madonna). Purchased in 1996 
Apartment on Collins Avenue, Miami, FL, USA. Purchased in 2002.
Apartment in Hallandale Beach, Florida, USA. Purchased in 2005
Villa in Alicante, Spain (neighbors – Mikhail Gorbachev, Victoria Beckham). Purchased in 2008

References
On account of Valery Leontiev there is even a duet with Vladimir Putin: in August 2006 in Sochi, a concert for the heads of the CIS, which Leontiev worked for a program of four songs. In the final speech, when the artist was called for an encore, he decided to perform the song "Hope." Suddenly, he was joined by Vladimir Putin, at that time president of Russia – Leontiev handed him a microphone. Star duo snatched the applause, as the leaders of CIS countries, as well as fellow artists.
Leontiev performing the hit "Margarita" in the presence of the President of Bulgaria, Slovakia, Romania, Moldova and Ukraine in 2008.
Nu, pogodi! Episode 16 – Valery Leontiev song Green Light was played by the Wolf when he was caught by Baba Yaga, on the magical guitar. The Wolf does escape however, but lands on the water.

See also
Russian pop music

References

External links
Official website

1949 births
Living people
People from the Komi Republic
Komi people
Soviet male singers
Soviet pop singers
Soviet male actors
Russian pop singers
20th-century Russian singers
21st-century Russian singers
People's Artists of Russia
World Music Awards winners
Recipients of the Lenin Komsomol Prize
Recipients of the title of Merited Artist of Ukraine
Recipients of the Order of Honour (Russia)
Russian pop musicians
20th-century Russian male singers
21st-century Russian male singers
Recipients of the Order "For Merit to the Fatherland", 4th class
Russian LGBT musicians
Russian National Music Award winners
Winners of the Golden Gramophone Award